Déjate Querer may refer to:

"Déjate Querer", 1999 song by Gilberto Santa Rosa from the album Expresión
"Déjate Querer", 2002 song by Los Tucanes de Tijuana
Déjate Querer, 2010 album by Pee Wee
"Déjate Querer", 2013 song by Los Huracanes del Norte